The Taft Commission, also known as the Second Philippine Commission (Filipino: Ikalawang Komisyon ng Pilipinas), was established by United States President William McKinley on March 16, 1900, following the recommendations of the First Philippine Commission, using presidential war powers while the U.S. was engaged in the Philippine–American War.

McKinley's letter of instruction to the commission defined American policies and intentions which make cultural and economic progress, acquire skill in self-government, and eventually progress to national independence. Emilio Aguinaldo, who led the Philippine war against America, wrote retrospectively in 1957 that McKinley's instructions to the commission would "prove one of the most important documents in the history of international relations."

The Second Commission was at first the sole legislative body of the Philippines, then known as the Philippine Islands under the sovereign control of the United States. After the passage of the Philippine Organic Act in 1902, the Commission functioned as the house of a bicameral legislature until it was supplanted by an elected legislature established in 1916 by the Philippine Autonomy Act.

William Howard Taft was the first head of the Philippine Commission from March 16, 1900 until July 4, 1901, after which the commission's head also became the Civil Governor of the Philippines. Taft served in that office until January 31, 1904, when he was appointed Secretary of War by President Theodore Roosevelt. Taft was succeeded by vice-governor Luke Edward Wright and the Philippine Commission was subsequently headed by a number of persons, but is often mentioned informally and collectively as the "Taft Commission".

Background
The Second Philippine Commission (the Taft Commission), established by President William McKinley on March 16, 1900, and headed by William Howard Taft, was granted legislative as well as limited executive powers. Between September 1900 and August 1902, it issued 499 laws, established a judicial system, including a Supreme Court, drew up a legal code, and organized a civil service. The 1901 municipal code provided for popularly elected presidentes, vicepresidentes, and councilors to serve on municipal boards. The municipal board members were responsible for collecting taxes, maintaining municipal properties, and undertaking necessary construction projects; they also elected provincial governors.

Commission membership

Timeline

Legislative powers

Background
Article 1, Section 1 of the United States Constitution specifies that the U.S. Congress exercises legislative power. Since the Philippines was in a state of war, however, the Executive Branch ran affairs there without much congressional intervention. President McKinley's instruction to the Philippine Commission in  April 1900 directed that, "... Beginning with the 1 day of September 1900, the authority to exercise that part of the power of government  in the Philippine Islands which is legislative, is to be transferred from the Military Governor to this commission." The instruction also gave the Commission the power to appoint officers under the judicial, educational, and civil service systems and in the municipal and departmental governments. The instruction charged the Commission, "... In all the forms of government and administrative provisions which they are authorized to proscribe, the Commission should bear in mind that the government which they are establishing is designed not for our satisfaction, or the expression of our theoretical views, but for the happiness, peace, and prosperity of the people of the Philippine islands, and measures adopted should be made to conform to their customs, their habits, and even their prejudices, to the fullest extent consistent with the accomplishment of just and effective government.".

In a statement published on September 1, 1900, the commissioners announced the holding of public meetings every Wednesday and Friday to allow interested parties to comment and make suggestions on proposed legislative matters. The open sessions were mainly conducted in English and Spanish. As the Americans became familiar with Spanish, the commissioners allowed their guests to use the language of their choice. William Forbes, later Governor General of the Philippines, wrote that he could not remember any instance where a commissioner protested because he could not understand an issue on linguistic grounds.

The Spooner Amendment (U.S.)
A few months before the inauguration of Taft as governor-general, Senator John Spooner filed a bill giving unprecedented powers to the executive branch in the development of colonial policy in the Philippines. The Democrats ferociously attacked the bill, resurrecting anti-imperialist arguments they had employed at the time of the Treaty of Paris. By February 1900, a filibuster was in full cry, with the Democrats determined to curb the powers of the Philippine Commission and reserve for Congress the right to grant franchises and sell lands in the Philippines. The Spooner bill was rejected on September 1, 1900, but McKinley nevertheless granted the Taft commission legislative powers. Legislators repackaged it as an amendment to the 1901 Army Appropriation Bill.

The passage of the Spooner amendment was a significant milestone in the development of U.S.–Philippine policy because it allowed the president to govern the Philippines by the authority of Congress and not by his wartime authority as commander in chief. Emilio Aguinaldo wrote in 1957 that the Spooner Amendment had laid the basis of a far-sighted and enlightened economic policy in the Philippines.

The Philippine Organic Act (U.S.)
The Philippine Organic Act of July 1902 was a basic law for the Insular Government (1901–1935). (The term "insular" refers to an unincorporated island territory.) The act provided that future appointments of the civil governor, vice-governor, members the Philippine Commission, and heads of Executive Departments shall be made by the President, by and with the advice and consent of the Senate.  The act also provided for the establishment of a bicameral legislature composed of a lower house, the Philippine Assembly, which would be popularly elected, and an upper house consisting of the Philippine Commission. The two houses would share legislative powers, although the upper house alone would pass laws relating to the Moros and other non-Christian peoples. The act also provided for extending the United States Bill of Rights to Filipinos and sending two Filipino resident commissioners to Washington to attend sessions of the United States Congress. The Philippine Assembly elections of 1907 were held on July 30, 1907 and the 1st Philippine Legislature opened its first session on October 16, 1907.

Legislation
The Taft Commission promulgated a total of 157 laws between September 1900 and July 4, 1901, when Taft became Civil Governor, classified as follows:

Following the advice of McKinley to start at the bottom and gradually move upward, over seventy percent of the laws dealt with local government and the bureaucracy; with more than half of these being acts extending the provision of the Provincial Government Act to the different provinces. Others were acts establishing municipalities, and the rest concerned the local police.

The thirty-three appropriations laws passed were appropriations to pay certain expenses not covered by the General Appropriations Act, including salaries of government employees, burial benefits for victims of the war, funds for the construction of roads and bridges, and other miscellaneous expenses.

Specific major items of legislation

Reorganization of local government units
The Commission created and reorganized government offices, including the following:

President McKinley had declared in his message to Congress in December 1899 that Philippine reconstruction should proceed by building up from the bottom. McKinley's instruction to the Commission stressed that the establishment of civilian government should start from the smallest unit of political organization and gradually move towards Manila. In compliance with this, on January 31, 1901, the Commission enacted Act No. 82, a Municipal Code to guide the formation and management of towns, and six days later passed Act No. 83, a Provincial Government Act which dealt with the procedure for the creation of provincial governments.

In some instances, the Commission doled out government offices to persuade leaders of the resistance movement to give up the fight. General Martin Delgado, for example, was appointed the governor of Iloilo and similar moves were done in Cavite, Bulacan, and Laguna with the appointment of Mariano Trias, Pablo Tecson, and Juan Cailles, respectively.

The Civil Service Act
The first major legislation passed by the commission was Act No. 5, the Civil Service Act, enacted on September 19, 1900. From the passage of this act until the departure of Taft from the Philippines, the number of Americans and Filipinos applying to serve the government continued to increase, as follows:

The Education Act of 1901
General  Elwell Otis had taken the initiative on September 1, 1898, of establishing a public school system, organizing seven schools in Manila. While the war was raging, American soldiers took time out to organize schools, and to teach classes. When General MacArthur assumed command, he continued the public education project and increased its budget. When the Taft Commission arrived in Manila, the Army had organized 39 schools in Manila with a daily attendance of between 4,500 and 5,000 students.

Commissioner Bernard Moses, who had been an educator at the University of California, worked with Captain Albert Todd and Dr. Fred Atkinson to draft Act No. 74, also known as the Education Act of 1901. The act was largely based on a report which Todd submitted to the Commission on April 17, 1900. Some of the recommendations in the Todd Report were:

That a comprehensive modern school system for the teaching of elementary English be inaugurated at the earliest possible moment.
That industrial schools for manual training be established as soon as a fair knowledge of English has been acquired.
That all schools under government control be conducted in the English language so far as in any way practicable, and that the use of Spanish and the dialects be only for a period of transition.
That English teachers, well trained in primary instruction, be brought over from the U.S. in sufficient numbers to take charge of the schools of the larger towns at least.
That a well-equipped normal school be established for instructing natives to be teachers of English.
That in the larger towns a portion, at least, of the schoolhouse must be made of a modern structure, plainly but well and properly equipped.
That the school supported by the Government be divorced from the Church. If the natives desire schools in which religious instruction is to be given, that they furnish the entire support for the same from private sources, but attendance from the latter schools shall not excuse the children from attendance at the public school where English is taught. Also, the Parochial Church school, if such are maintained, shall be required to be equal in character of the general instruction to the public school.

On January 21, 1901, the commission enacted Act No. 74, establishing the Department of Public Instruction. Section One of the act provided that primary instruction should be free of charge and open to all Filipinos. Commissioner Bernard Moses became Secretary of Public Instruction and Dr. Atkinson became General Superintendent of Public Instruction. Atkinson was tasked to put up a school in every pueblo and empowered to fix the salaries of teachers, formulate curricula, purchase school supplies, construct school buildings, and disburse the funds of the Department. A Superior Advisory Board assisted Atkinson in policy-making concerning educational needs and the condition of the islands. Act 74 divided the archipelago  into divisions composed of school districts and ordered the creation of Normal and Trade schools in Manila and a School of Agriculture in Negros.

At the time Taft arrived in the Philippines, the student-teacher ratio was one teacher for 4,179 students. Section 15 of Act 74 empowered the general superintendent to import 1,000 teachers from the U.S. The first batch of 48 American teachers arrived in June 1901. The second batch of 509 teachers (386 men and 141 women, accompanied by 4 nurses, 13 spouses) arrived in August, and became known as the Thomasites, after the United States Army Transport Thomas, one of the ships which transported them.

From the very start, serious problems threatened the success of the educational program. Problems encountered included opposition from Catholic clerics, language difficulties, health problems and difficulty in adjusting to the tropical climate, financial problems brought on by delayed salary payments, lack of school buildings (many of the 2,167 primary schools existing before the war had either been destroyed or pressed into use by the army as barracks, prisons, or hospitals), etc.  Cultural values which had developed under Spanish rule also posed a severe hindrance.  The Thomasites had a difficult time convincing their students to give more importance to activities that developed critical thinking than to those which simply required rote memorization, or that coming an hour late or being absent to attend a town fiesta was a big shortcoming.

Another problem encountered was difficulty in promoting equality among the students, as children of wealthy families thought they were entitled to special privileges. Some wealthy parents openly opposed the American educational system because of the insecurities it created.  For them, education was a privilege of their class and should not be extended to the common people. They believed that general education would create an imbalance in the country's workforce, with the labor market having a surplus of people seeking white-collars and a shortage of people willing to engage in manual work.  To address this concern, education officials propagated the trade and agricultural schools, explaining that graduates of these schools were at par with those earning degrees from the normal school and universities.

As the years went by, the Thomasites won the respect and admiration not only of their students but also of their parents. The parents admired the way the American teachers treated their children and managed classroom activities. Specifically, they lauded the abolition of corporal punishment. The Thomasites' friendliness, informality, and approachability were admired by many Filipinos, who still remembered bad experiences with the aristocratic Spanish.

Friar lands
The instructions of President McKinley to the commission stipulated that it was their duty to make a thorough investigation into the titles of large tracts of land held or claimed by individuals or by religious orders. The commission conducted a series of public hearings into the matter beginning on July 31, 1900, and lasting until November. On November 30, 1900, a 604-page report submitted by the commission discussed the friar lands in detail, recommending that "... the insular government buy the large haciendas of the friars and sell them out as small holdings to the present tenants." In 1902, testifying in the U.S. before the House Committee on Insular Affairs, Taft repeated this recommendation, appraising the market value of the friar lands as between $2,500,000 to $7,000,000 in gold, and proposing that the Insular Government be allowed to float bonds for the purchase of the lands and use the proceeds from the sale of the lands to settle the bonds.

The Philippine Organic Act, enacted in July 1902, authorized the Insular Government to purchase the friar lands, empowering it to issue bonds for the purpose. Taft traveled to Rome in May 1902, meeting with Pope Leo XIII and proposing to buy the lands. The Pope promised to study the issue and expressed support for the American pacification program. On November 18, 1902, Papal representative Jean Baptiste Guidi arrived in Manila to negotiate the sale of the lands. Taft commissioned a survey to determine their market value, and a purchase price of $7,239,784.66 was paid in December 1903 by the Insular Government. The land was eventually resold to Filipinos, some of them tenants but the majority of the estate owners.

This was the first program of modern land reform in the Philippines.

See also
Philippine Commission
First Philippine Commission
Congress of the Philippines
Senate of the Philippines
House of Representatives of the Philippines

References

Sources
.
.
.
.
.
 
.
.

Further reading

Books
.
 .
.
.
.
.
.
.
.

Other items
Philippine House of Representatives Congressional Library

External links

.

Political history of the Philippines
History of the Congress of the Philippines
United States national commissions